Porte de Namur or Naamsepoort (Dutch) is a Brussels Metro station on the southern segment of lines 2 and 6. It is located under the Small Ring (Brussels' inner ring road) and next to the /, in the municipality of Ixelles, south of the City of Brussels, Belgium.

The station opened as a premetro (underground tram) station on 20 December 1970 and became a heavy metro station on 2 October 1988. It takes its name from the ancient Namur Gate area, itself named after the Namur Gate in Brussels' old city walls.

External links

Ixelles
Brussels metro stations
Railway stations opened in 1970